Amillis is a commune in the Seine-et-Marne department in the Île-de-France region in north-central France.

Geography
The village lies in the middle of the commune, on the right bank of the Aubetin, which flows northwestward through the commune.

Demographics
The inhabitants are Amilissiens.

See also
 Communes of the Seine-et-Marne department

References

External links

 1999 Land Use, from IAURIF (Institute for Urban Planning and Development of the Paris-Île-de-France région) 
 

Communes of Seine-et-Marne